Billings Cemetery was established in Billings, Montana, United States, in 1882 by the O'Donnell family and operated by them until the city purchased it in 1926. The Cemetery merged with Mountview Cemetery in 1926.

References

Cemeteries in Montana
Buildings and structures in Billings, Montana
1882 establishments in Montana Territory